Hara Gebeya is a town in north-eastern Ethiopia.

Transport 
Hara Gebeya is to receive a railway station in one of the new standard gauge railways connecting Addis Ababa with a port at Djibouti.

References 

Populated places in the Amhara Region